Eurythmasis is a monotypic snout moth genus described by Harrison Gray Dyar Jr. in 1914. It contains the species Eurythmasis ignifatua, described by the same author. It is found in Panama.

References

Phycitinae
Monotypic moth genera
Moths of Central America